Joseph Puy (9 July 1907 – 30 October 1980) was a French racing cyclist. He rode in the 1932 Tour de France.

References

1907 births
1980 deaths
French male cyclists
Place of birth missing